Wyoming Highway 377 (WYO 377) was a short  Wyoming state road in central Sweetwater County that served the community of Point of Rocks and the Jim Bridger Power Plant. It was decommissioned in 2017.

Route description
Wyoming Highway 377 began at exit 130 of Interstate 80/US 30 in Point of Rocks, a Census-designated place located east of Rock Springs. WYO 377 traveled eastward along the north side of Interstate 80/US Route 30, which it paralleled. At just under 2 miles, Highway 377 ended, though the roadway continued north, as 9 Mile Road, providing access to and from the Jim Bridger Power Station.

History
Highway 377 was the former alignment of US 30 (Lincoln Highway) through this area and paralleled Interstate 80 which carries the present day routing of US 30.

Major intersections

References

External links 

Wyoming State Routes 300-399
WYO 377 - I-80/US 30 to Jim Bridger Power Plant

Transportation in Sweetwater County, Wyoming
377